Hiromitsu Ochiai (落合 博満 Ochiai Hiromitsu, born December 9, 1953) is a Japanese professional baseball manager and former player. He is former manager of the Chunichi Dragons in Japan's Nippon Professional Baseball. He is considered to be one of the most important players in the history of Japanese baseball, winning numerous batting awards and being the only player to receive the prestigious triple crown batting award three times. With 510 career home runs, Ochiai is sixth on the all-time NPB list. Ochiai's style is called Oreryu(オレ流). Oreryu means "to do with only my style." The word described how he acted according to his personal philosophies.

Biography
Ochiai was born in the town of Wakami in Akita, Japan, a rice-farming area of northern Honshū. Ochiai was the youngest of seven children and grew up enjoying spending time in the cinema rather than on the baseball field. At Toyo University, he quit after one year as he did not approve of the traditional way freshman players had to cater to the senior players on the team. He joined Toshiba Fuchu, a team in the Japanese industrial league, after leaving Toyo University and went back to his home town and spent some years as a professional bowler.

In 1978, at 25 years old, the third baseman joined Lotte Orions after being selected in the third round of the draft. The Lotte manager did not care for his unorthodox right-handed batting style and Masaichi Kaneda criticized Ochiai, but Isao Harimoto supported Ochiai and Ochiai did not quit. From 1981, Ochiai played a regular role for his team, and in 1982 he won his first triple crown batting title. He also won the Triple crown in 1985 and 1986, and continued winning titles through 1991.

In 1987, Ochiai was traded to the Chunichi Dragons by the Lotte Orions. During the 1994 season, the Yomiuri Giants picked up Ochiai as a free agent. After the Giants signed Kazuhiro Kiyohara in 1997, Ochiai joined the Nippon-Ham Fighters at the age of 43. At the conclusion of the 1998 season, Ochiai retired.
 
Hiromitsu Ochiai was the manager of the Chunichi Dragons from 2004 to 2011. He led the Dragons to the Japan Series during his inaugural year as manager in 2004, again in 2006, and led them to victory on the third try in 2007. His contract was not renewed after leading the Dragons to within a game of winning the 2011 Japan Series. He was often criticized for his decision-making, such as removing starting pitcher Daisuke Yamai to start the ninth inning of game five of the 2007 Japan Series. Yamai had been pitching a perfect game. Closer Hitoki Iwase finished off the ninth for a rare combined perfect game to clinch the championship for the Dragons.

Ochiai was inducted into the Japanese Baseball Hall of Fame in 2011. The Hiromitsu Ochiai Baseball Hall opened in Taiji, Wakayama in 1993 starting a trend of museums dedicated to famous ballplayers.

On October 9, 2013, Ochiai was appointed general manager of the Chunichi Dragons. On December 20, 2016 it was announced that Ochiai would step down from his role as general manager at the end of his contract in January 2017.

Awards and accomplishments
 MVP (1982, 1985)
 Triple Crown (1982, 1985, 1986)
 Batting Title (1981~1983, 1985, 1986)
 Home run Title (1982, 1985, 1986, 1990, 1991)
 Run batted in Title (1982, 1985, 1986, 1989, 1990)
 On-base percentage Title (1982, 1985~1988, 1990, 1991)
 Best Nine Award (1981~1986, 1988~1991)
 Matsutaro Shoriki Award (2007)

Career batting statistics

References

External links

1953 births
Chunichi Dragons managers
Chunichi Dragons players
Japanese baseball players
Living people
Lotte Orions players
Managers of baseball teams in Japan
Nippon Ham Fighters players
Nippon Professional Baseball first basemen
Nippon Professional Baseball MVP Award winners
Nippon Professional Baseball second basemen
Nippon Professional Baseball third basemen
Baseball people from Akita Prefecture
Yomiuri Giants players
Japanese Baseball Hall of Fame inductees